Teho Teardo is an Italian musician and composer.

He is a founding member of the rock band Meathead. In the 1990s he collaborated with Mick Harris, Jim Coleman and Lydia Lunch. With Scott McCloud (Girls Against Boys) he started a new project called Operator. Together they released an album titled Welcome to the Wonderful World in 2003, and toured with Placebo. In 2006 he made an album inspired by Pier Paolo Pasolini's poetry with Erik Friedlander. In 2013 he started a fruitful collaboration with Blixa Bargeld and they have released four albums to date.

Teardo has composed musical scores for many Italian films like Gabriele Salvatores' Denti or Paolo Sorrentino's The Family Friend and Il Divo. For Denti he was awarded the Quality prize from the Italian Minister of Culture. For his soundtrack Il Divo Teardo won the David di Donatello Award in 2009.

He lives and works in Rome.

Discography 

Solo releases:
Caught from Behind (1984)
Paid in Full (1988)
Tower/Microphone (2005)
Ballyturk (2014)

With Erik Friedlander:
Giorni Rubati (2006)

With Modern Institute:
Excellent Swimmer (2006)

With Operator:
Welcome to the Wonderful World (2003)

With Here:
Brooklyn Bank (1997)

With Matera:
Same Here (1996)

With Blixa Bargeld:
Still Smiling (2013)
Spring (2014)
Nerissimo (2016)
Fall (2017)

References

External links

tehoteardo.com
Modern Institute MySpace Page

Italian sound artists
Italian musicians
Living people
David di Donatello winners
1966 births